Ennomos alniaria, the canary-shouldered thorn, is a moth of the family Geometridae. The species was first described by Carl Linnaeus in his 1758 10th edition of Systema Naturae. It can be found in Europe in a wide variety of biotopes where there are deciduous trees, perhaps mostly in deciduous forests and gardens.

Description
The wingspan is 34–42 mm. The length of the forewings is 16–20 mm. Resembles Ennomos quercinaria, but has a canary-yellow thorax. The forewings are scalloped and there are also two cross lines. The wings are ochre yellow with greyish flecks. The bands, a small discal spot on the forewing and a larger discal spot on the hindwing are grey. The larva is brownish-grey, long and thin, with four raised cross-bands on the dorsal side. It closely resembles a dead twig. 

Other Ennomos species are similar.

Distribution
Caucasus and Russia to western Europe. The northern limit is Fennoscandia and the southern limit is the northern Mediterranean.

Biology
The moths fly in one generation from July to October. They are attracted to light.

The larvae feed on a number of deciduous trees including downy birch and silver birch, alder and goat willow.

References

Notes
The flight season refers to the British Isles. This may vary in other parts of the range.

External links
Canary-shouldered thorn on UKMoths
Lepidoptera of Belgium
Lepiforum e.V.
De Vlinderstichting 

Ennomini
Moths described in 1758
Moths of Europe
Taxa named by Carl Linnaeus